"Sweet Summer Lovin'" a song written by Bud Reneau and Blaise Tosti, and recorded by American entertainer Dolly Parton.  It was released in August 1979 as the second single from the album Great Balls of Fire.  "Sweet Summer Lovin'" reached number 7 on the U.S. country charts. (It was the first Dolly Parton single in two years not to top the charts.) It also topped the charts in Yugoslavia.

Though not a double-A-sided single, per se, the flip side, Parton's cover of "Great Balls of Fire", did receive a modest amount of radio airplay during the single's chart tenure.

Chart performance

References

External links
Sweet Summer Lovin' lyrics at Dolly Parton On-Line

1979 singles
1979 songs
Dolly Parton songs
RCA Records singles